Kanyakumari Government Medical College, also known as KGMC, KGMCH, or Government Medical College Kanyakumari) is a medical education institution in Asaripallam, in the city of Nagercoil, Tamil Nadu, South India. The college is affiliated to Tamil Nadu Dr. MGR Medical University and is recognised by the Medical Council of India.

History
The Govt. T.B. Hospital campus at Asaripallam, Nagercoil in Kanyakumari District was selected as the site for the proposed Government Medical College. As per the Medical Council of India's instructions that the medical college and hospital should occupy the same campus, there is also a 500-bed hospital. The first batch of MBBS commenced in the year 2004.

Nearly 500 medical students and many paramedic students are in training in this institution at any time.

Administration 
The college is affiliated with the Tamil Nadu Dr. MGR Medical University. The college and the hospital are funded and managed by the Government of Tamil Nadu.

Hospital 
The multi-speciality government hospital is open to public 24 hours throughout the year. Serves as the tertiary care centre for the district. The hospital has several blocks dedicated to patients. The Out-Patient block is spacious and has high footfall every day. A Heritage Block dedicated for Super speciality OPD is located behind the central park. There are two major In-Patient Blocks located behind the OPD. The main block has wards dedicated to gynaecology and obstetrics, paediatrics, orthopaedics, ENT, cancer and has two operation theatres along with the 24-hour laboratory. The CT and MRI scan facilities are available in the basement.

The Additional Block has the medical and surgical wards their intensive care units. It also houses the Radiology and Anaesthesia departments. The block has three operation theatres with the latest instruments. The X-Ray, USG, ECHO, Bronchoscopy, EEG diagnostic facilities are available in the ground floor.

The hospital has a dedicated block for Ophthalmology with its own operating theatre. Separate blocks for casualty and emergency wards, Thoracic medicine ward, Dermatology, Psychiatry, Septic, Gastroenterology, Isolation, ART centre, RNTCP centre, Blood Bank, are present inside the vast campus.

A 24-hour Police station is present within the campus along with a mortuary. The drugs dispensary is located near the rear gate

Academics
The college has good infrastructure and has spacious lecture halls and classrooms with projectors and digital boards along with an air-conditioned examination hall. The main Faculty Block present opposite the central park, has the departments of Anatomy, Forensic Medicine, Physiology, Pathology, Pharmacology, Community Medicine (with Tele-Medicine), Microbiology and Biochemistry with their respective laboratories. Sufficiently loaded library with latest books, reading room, computer room is present adjacently. The wards and OPD also have attached classrooms and demo rooms for clinical classes.

Student Facilities
A large auditorium is located near the entrance which holds the annual cultural events, graduation ceremonies, medical education programmes etc. Separate hostels with good infrastructure and hygienic food with recreational facilities are available for boys and girls. CRRIs and Post-Graduates have independent-room hostels with a separate mess along with a common-room for day scholars with lockers and restrooms. Free Wifi facility is being provided for the students.

Sports facilities like table-tennis, football cum cricket ground, volleyball, basketball and badminton courts are provided. A well-equipped co-operative store and a cafeteria are open during college hours within the campus. The Green Care organization has made sure the college is clean and green. and a major nationalised bank (Indian Overseas Bank) is on the vast campus.

Courses
The college offers a 5.5-year Bachelor of Medicine, Bachelor of Surgery (MBBS) degree, as well as a diploma in Nursing (GNM) and a diploma in Medical Lab Technology (DMLT), 4 year Bachelor of Science (B.Sc Paramedical) in Renal Dialysis technology (From 2018 onwards).In the year 2018 -2019  post-graduate courses have started.

The college offers post-graduate courses in General Medicine,General surgery,Anaesthesia,Obstetrics and gynaecology, Paediatrics
,Orthopaedics, Emergency Medicine,Ophthalmology and Otorhinolaryngology.

References

External links
 The Tamil Nadu Dr. MGR Medical University
 The Government of Tamil Nadu

Medical colleges in Tamil Nadu
Universities and colleges in Kanyakumari district
Education in Nagercoil